Igai ni Mango (意外にマンゴー Surprisingly Mango) is the 21st single from Japanese idol girl group SKE48, being released on . The song reached number one on the Oricon Weekly Singles Chart, selling 272,872 copies in the first week. It also reached number one on the Billboard Japan Hot 100.

This is the last single to feature Masana Ōya .

Track listing

Type A

Type B

Type C

Type D

Theater version

Personnel

"Igai ni Mango (Senbatsu)" 
The performers of the main single are:
Team S: Kitagawa Ryoha, Jurina Matsui
Team KII: Ego Yuna, Oba Mina, Obata Yuna, Kitano Ruka, Souda Sarina, Takayanagi Akane, Takeuchi Saki, Hidaka Yuzuki, Furuhata Nao
Team E: Kimoto Kanon, Kumazaki Haruka, Goto Rara, Suda Akari
Kenkyuusei: Yahagi Yukina

"Party ni wa Ikitakunai" 
"Party ni wa Ikitakunai" was performed by Team S members, consisting of:
Team S: Isshiki Rena, Inuzuka Asana, Oya Masana, Kamimura Ayuka, Kitagawa Ryoha, Goto Risako, Sugiyama Aika, Tsuzuki Rika, Nojima Kano, Futamura Haruka, Machi Otoha, Matsui Jurina, Matsumoto Chikako, Yamauchi Suzuran, Yamada Juna

"En wo Egaku" 
"En wo Egaku" was performed by Team KII members, consisting of:
Team KII: Aoki Shiori, Arai Yuki, Uchiyama Mikoto, Ego Yuna, Ota Ayaka, Oba Mina, Obata Yuna, Kitano Ruka, Shirai Kotono, Souda Sarina, Takagi Yumana, Takatsuka Natsuki, Takayanagi Akane, Takeuchi Saki, Hidaka Yuzuki, Furuhata Nao, Matsumura Kaori, Mizuno Airi

"Oretoku" 
"Oretoku" was performed by Team E members, consisting of:
Team E: Asai Yuka, Ida Reona, Ichino Narumi, Kamata Natsuki, Kimoto Kanon, Kumazaki Haruka, Goto Rara, Saito Makiko, Sato Sumire, Suenaga Oka, Sugawara Maya, Suda Akari, Takatera Sana, Takahata Yuki, Tani Marika, Fukushi Nao

"Eien no Legacy" 
"Eien no Legacy" was performed by Masana Ōya:
Team S: Masana Ōya

"Yume no Kaidan wo Nobore!" 
"Yume no Kaidan wo Nobore!" was performed by Kenkyuusei members, consisting of:
Kenkyuusei: Aikawa Honoka, Atsumi Ayaha, Ishikawa Saki, Ishiguro Yuzuki, Inoue Ruka, Oshiba Rinka, Okada Miku, Kataoka Narumi, Kitagawa Yoshino, Kurashima Ami, Sakamoto Marin, Sato Kaho, Shirayuki Kohaku, Nakamura Izumi, Nonogaki Miki, Nomura Miyo, Fukai Negai, Morihira Riko, Yahagi Yukina, Wada Aina

"Kiseki no Ryuuseigun" 
"Kiseki no Ryuuseigun" was performed by the SKE48 grouping Passion For You Senbatsu, consisting of:
Team S: Oya Masana, Goto Risako, Futamura Haruka, Matsui Jurina, Matsumoto Chikako
Team KII: Aoki Shiori, Arai Yuki, Ego Yuna, Ota Ayaka, Oba Mina, Shirai Kotono, Takayanagi Akane, Takeuchi Saki, Furuhata Nao
Team E: Kamata Natsuki, Suda Akari

Release history

MNL48 Version 
SKE48's sister group in Manila, Philippines, MNL48 released a cover of the song with the same name. MNL48's version was released as a coupling song on their third single "365 Araw ng Eroplanong Papel". This MNL48 version is performed by Team L, a sub-team within the group. The center for the music video is MNL48 Sela, the second most popular member of the group based on their election. The music video was released on YouTube on June 2019 and was shot in Star City.

References 

J-pop songs
2017 singles
SKE48 songs
Oricon Weekly number-one singles
Billboard Japan Hot 100 number-one singles
2017 songs
Songs written by Yasushi Akimoto
MNL48 songs